Shucharu Ranjan Haldar is a member of Parliament of India elected from Ranaghat, West Bengal. He is a member of Bharatiya Janta Party. He was born on 17 May 1940. He is a doctor by profession. He has M.B.B.S., DTM and H, BDV, M.D. degrees. He won the 2009 Lok Sabha election from Ranaghat (Lok Sabha constituency) by a margin of 101,823 votes.

References

Living people
India MPs 2009–2014
1940 births
Trinamool Congress politicians from West Bengal
University of Calcutta alumni
Bharatiya Janata Party politicians from West Bengal
People from Nadia district